Cameron Levins (born March 28, 1989) is a Canadian long-distance runner. He won the bronze medal in the 10,000 meters at the 2014 Commonwealth Games. Levins had the best-Canadian finish ever of fourth in the marathon at the 2022 World Championships, setting a new Canadian record. He is the North American record holder for the marathon and the Canadian record holder for the half marathon.

Levins represented Canada at the 2012 London and 2020 Tokyo Olympics.

Career
Cam Levins comes from Black Creek and Courtenay, British Columbia.

In 2012, he qualified for the 2012 London Olympics in the 5000 meters and 10,000 meters events at the 2012 Canadian Olympic Trials in Calgary, Alberta, where he took first place in the 5000 m. At the Games, Levins finished 14th in the 5000 m in a time of 13:51.87 and 11th in the 10,000 m with a time of 27:40.68, despite catching the flu just before the finals.

He finished 14th in the 10,000 meters at the 2013 World Championships in Athletics in Moscow.

Levins was the Men's 2012 Bowerman Award winner, which is the NCAA's annual award to the most outstanding collegiate athlete in track & field. He was the first Canadian recipient of the award.

In the 2014 Commonwealth Games in Glasgow, he led down the final stretch with a "spectacular kick" but finished third in 27:56.23, less than one-tenth of a second behind winner Moses Kipsiro.

On October 21, 2018, making his marathon debut, Levins broke Jerome Drayton's 43-year-old Canadian men's record for the marathon, finishing fourth in the 29th annual Toronto Waterfront Marathon in 2:09:25, a 44-second improvement on the previous national record.

He represented Canada at the 2020 Tokyo Olympics, placing 72nd in the Olympic marathon in a time of 2:28:43.

Levins finished fourth in the marathon at the 2022 World Athletics Championships held in Eugene, Oregon in a new Canadian men's record time of 2:07:09, taking two minutes off his previous national record set in 2018; it was also the best Canadian finish ever in the event.

On February 12, 2023, he broke Ben Flanagan's 2022 Canadian record in the half marathon with a time of 60:18 at the First Half in Vancouver, becoming the first Canadian to break the 61-minute barrier in the event (Flanagan's record was 61:00).

On March 5, 2023, Levins improved his own Canadian marathon record by more than 90 seconds to break the North American record and finish fifth at the Tokyo Marathon. He ran a time of 2:05:36, taking two seconds off the previous area best.

Career highlights
 Two-time NCAA Champion:
 2012: 5000m, 10,000m
 14-time Summit League Champion:
 2008-09: 1500m
 2009-10: XC, mile (indoor), 3000m (indoor)
 2010-11: 1500m, 5000m
 2011-12: XC, 800m(indoor), mile (indoor), 3000m (indoor), 5000m (indoor), 1500m, 5000m, 10,000m
 Three-time Canadian XC Champion: 2010, 2011, 2012

Canadian record holder for:
 Half marathon – 1:00:18 (Vancouver 2023) 
 Marathon – 2:05:36 (Tokyo 2023) North American record

See also
 Canadian records in track and field

References

External links
 
 

1989 births
Living people
Canadian male long-distance runners
Olympic track and field athletes of Canada
Athletes (track and field) at the 2012 Summer Olympics
People from Campbell River, British Columbia
Athletes (track and field) at the 2014 Commonwealth Games
Athletes (track and field) at the 2015 Pan American Games
World Athletics Championships athletes for Canada
Commonwealth Games bronze medallists for Canada
Commonwealth Games medallists in athletics
Canadian Track and Field Championships winners
Pan American Games track and field athletes for Canada
Athletes (track and field) at the 2020 Summer Olympics
Canadian male marathon runners
Olympic male marathon runners
Medallists at the 2014 Commonwealth Games